Lymari Nadal Torres (born 11 February 1978) is a Puerto Rican actress, film producer and scriptwriter. She has performed in several films including American Gangster and Battlestar Galactica: The Plan. In 2011, she also produced her own film, America, which she also wrote.

Early life and education
Nadal was born in Ponce, Puerto Rico, to Daniel Nadal and Anaida Torres. She graduated from high school at Academia Santa María. She received her first college degree from the Pontifical Catholic University of Puerto Rico. In an interview, she described herself as "Ponce-blooded."

Personal life
In 2001, she moved to Los Angeles, California, and married actor and director Edward James Olmos in 2002. The two separated in 2013.

Filmography

References

External links
 
 Lymari Nadal at Battlestar Wiki

1978 births
Puerto Rican film actresses
Puerto Rican people of Spanish descent
Puerto Rican people of Catalan descent
Living people
Actresses from Ponce, Puerto Rico